Gian Giacomo Cristoforo (1588 – 8 May 1649) was a Roman Catholic prelate who served as Bishop of Lacedonia (1649).

Biography
Gian Giacomo Cristoforo was born in Piaggine, Italy in 1588.
On 12 April 1649, he was appointed during the papacy of Pope Innocent X as Bishop of Lacedonia.
On 18 April 1649, he was consecrated bishop by Pier Luigi Carafa, Cardinal-Priest of Santi Silvestro e Martino ai Monti, with Ranuccio Scotti Douglas, Bishop of Borgo San Donnino, and Enea di Cesare Spennazzi, Bishop of Ferentino, serving as co-consecrators. 
He served as Bishop of Lacedonia until his death on 8 May 1649.

References

External links and additional sources
 (for Chronology of Bishops) 
 (for Chronology of Bishops) 

17th-century Italian Roman Catholic bishops
Bishops appointed by Pope Innocent X
1588 births
1649 deaths